The River Roden is a river in Shropshire, England, which rises near  Wem Moss where the Llangollen Canal passes above its headwaters. It flows south east and meets the River Tern at Walcot.

Villages and towns it flows through or near to, include:

Wem
 Aston
Lee Brockhurst
Shawbury
Roden
Rodington

Wildlife
The River Roden is also recognised for its abundance of wildlife. Predatory birds, foxes and other animals are common to this river and there is also a large variety of fish, including:

Chub - which are largely sought by anglers in the river
Pike - for which the river is known
Barbel - which are unusual for a river like the Roden, although they do not grow to a large size here
Dace - which are abundant in the river
Perch
Roach
Minnow

References

Rivers of Shropshire
1Roden